Huston Township is a township in Centre County, Pennsylvania, United States. It is part of the State College, Pennsylvania Metropolitan Statistical Area. The population was 1,333 at the 2020 census.

Geography

Huston Township is bordered by Rush Township to the northwest, Union Township to the northeast, Patton Township to the southeast and Worth Township to the southwest.

Demographics

As of the census of 2000, there were 1,311 people, 500 households, and 370 families residing in the township.  The population density was 50.4 people per square mile (19.5/km).  There were 547 housing units at an average density of 21.0/sq mi (8.1/km).  The racial makeup of the township was 97.25% White, 0.31% African American, 0.31% Native American, 0.31% Asian, 0.08% Pacific Islander, 0.92% from other races, and 0.84% from two or more races. Hispanic or Latino of any race were 1.53% of the population.

There were 500 households, out of which 32.8% had children under the age of 18 living with them, 61.6% were married couples living together, 9.0% had a female householder with no husband present, and 26.0% were non-families. 21.2% of all households were made up of individuals, and 7.6% had someone living alone who was 65 years of age or older.  The average household size was 2.62 and the average family size was 3.02.

In the township the population was spread out, with 25.0% under the age of 18, 7.0% from 18 to 24, 31.0% from 25 to 44, 27.5% from 45 to 64, and 9.5% who were 65 years of age or older.  The median age was 37 years. For every 100 females, there were 104.5 males.  For every 100 females age 18 and over, there were 100.2 males.

The median income for a household in the township was $38,500, and the median income for a family was $42,386. Males had a median income of $30,417 versus $26,250 for females. The per capita income for the township was $16,268.  About 10.3% of families and 13.9% of the population were below the poverty line, including 19.3% of those under age 18 and 10.1% of those age 65 or over.

References

Populated places established in 1784
Townships in Centre County, Pennsylvania
Townships in Pennsylvania